

Episodes

Borneo (Season 1, 2000)

The Australian Outback (Season 2, 2001)

Africa (Season 3, 2001–02)

Marquesas (Season 4, 2002)

Thailand (Season 5, 2002)

The Amazon (Season 6, 2003)

Pearl Islands (Season 7, 2003)

All-Stars (Season 8, 2004)

Vanuatu (Season 9, 2004)

Palau (Season 10, 2005)

Guatemala (Season 11, 2005)

Panama (Season 12, 2006)

Cook Islands (Season 13, 2006)

Fiji (Season 14, 2007)

China (Season 15, 2007)

Micronesia (Season 16, 2008)

Gabon (Season 17, 2008)

Tocantins (Season 18, 2009)

Samoa (Season 19, 2009)

Heroes vs. Villains (Season 20, 2010)

Future seasons

References

External links 
 
 

Survivor (American TV series)
Lists of American reality television series episodes